Kathryn Marie Hahn (born July 23, 1973) is an American actress and comedian. She began her career on television, starring as grief counselor Lily Lebowski in the NBC crime drama series Crossing Jordan (2001–2007). Hahn gained prominence appearing as a supporting actress in a number of comedy films, including How to Lose a Guy in 10 Days (2003), Anchorman: The Legend of Ron Burgundy (2004), Step Brothers (2008),  The Goods: Live Hard, Sell Hard (2009), Our Idiot Brother (2011), We're the Millers, and The Secret Life of Walter Mitty (both 2013).

As a lead actress in film, Hahn starred in Joey Soloway's comedy-drama Afternoon Delight (2013), the comedy film Bad Moms (2016), and its 2017 sequel, and the Tamara Jenkins drama Private Life (2018). For the latter, she received critical acclaim and a Gotham Award nomination for Best Actress. She has appeared in various dramatic films, including Revolutionary Road (2008), This Is Where I Leave You (2014), Tomorrowland (2015), The Visit (2015), and Captain Fantastic (2016), for which she received her first Screen Actors Guild Award nomination. She voiced Ericka Van Helsing in the Hotel Transylvania franchise and Doctor Octopus in the Academy Award winning animated film Spider-Man: Into the Spider-Verse (2018).

In television, Hahn was featured in a recurring guest role on the NBC sitcom Parks and Recreation (2012–2015), for which she received a Critics' Choice nomination for Best Guest Performer in a Comedy Series, she starred in the Amazon Prime Video comedy-drama series Transparent (2014–2019), for which she received a nomination for a Primetime Emmy Award for Outstanding Supporting Actress in a Comedy Series. Hahn also starred in the Amazon Prime Video comedy series I Love Dick (2016–2017), the HBO comedy miniseries Mrs. Fletcher (2019), and the HBO drama miniseries I Know This Much Is True (2020). Since 2020, Hahn has voiced Paige Hunter in the Apple TV+ animated musical comedy series Central Park.

She starred as Agatha Harkness in the Marvel Cinematic Universe miniseries WandaVision (2021), for which she received critical acclaim and a nomination for the Primetime Emmy Award for Outstanding Supporting Actress in a Limited Series or Movie.

Early life
Kathryn Marie Hahn was born in Westchester, Illinois, the daughter of Karen (née Bunker) and Bill Hahn.

She grew up in Cleveland Heights, Ohio, and was raised Catholic, attending St. Ann's Catholic school in Cleveland Heights and Beaumont School. Hahn attended Northwestern University, where she obtained a BA in theater. Afterward, she earned her MFA in drama from Yale University.

Career

1999–2012: Early work 
Hahn's first appearance on any television program was Hickory Hideout, a local puppet show for children for then-NBC owned-and-operated station WKYC in Cleveland. (By the time of its cancellation, Hickory Hideout was airing across all of NBC's O&O stations.) While attending a festival, she was introduced to creator/producer Tim Kring. Hahn impressed Kring so favorably that he created the character of Lily Lebowski in Crossing Jordan specifically for her. The series aired from 2001 to 2007. Hahn has said of meeting Kring, "NBC and Tim Kring took a huge leap of faith in casting me. To be worked into a show that was in production and on the schedule is an amazing stroke of luck." On October 21, 2008, TV Guide reported that Hahn had signed a talent holding deal with Fox.

In 2003, Hahn appeared in a supporting role alongside Kate Hudson and Matthew McConaughey in the romantic comedy film How to Lose a Guy in 10 Days. The following year she appeared in Win a Date with Tad Hamilton!, Anchorman: The Legend of Ron Burgundy, Around the Bend, and Wake Up, Ron Burgundy: The Lost Movie. She later had more supporting roles in films, including the 2005 romantic comedy-drama A Lot like Love starring Ashton Kutcher and Amanda Peet; The Holiday (2006) with Cameron Diaz; the science fiction adventure drama The Last Mimzy (2007) alongside Rainn Wilson; Step Brothers (2008); Revolutionary Road (2008) starring Leonardo DiCaprio and Kate Winslet; The Goods: Live Hard, Sell Hard (2009), How Do You Know (2010), Our Idiot Brother (2011), and Wanderlust (2012).

In 2008, she made her Broadway theatre debut in the revival of the comedy Boeing-Boeing starring opposite Mark Rylance. She starred as Gloria, an American fiancée and airline stewardess.

On television, Hahn starred alongside Hank Azaria in the short-lived NBC comedy series Free Agents, a 2011 remake of the British series of the same name. She had recurring roles on HBO shows Hung and Girls. From 2012 to 2015, she received praise for her recurring role on the NBC comedy series Parks and Recreation as Jennifer Barkley, the campaign manager of Leslie Knope's (Amy Poehler) opponent Bobby Newport (Paul Rudd). (She had previously costarred with Rudd in Our Idiot Brother, How Do You Know, and Wanderlust.)

She received a 2012 Critics' Choice Television Award nomination for Best Guest Performer in a Comedy Series for her performance in Parks and Recreation.

2013–2017: Film and television breakthrough

In 2013 Hahn played her first leading role, in the comedy-drama film Afternoon Delight, which was written and directed by Joey Soloway. The film premiered at the 2013 Sundance Film Festival. For her role, she was nominated for the Gotham Independent Film Award for Breakthrough Actor. Later that year Hahn appeared opposite Jennifer Aniston (her co-star in Wanderlust) in the box-office hit We're the Millers and co-starred alongside Ben Stiller and Kristen Wiig in The Secret Life of Walter Mitty. In 2014 she starred in the comedy film Bad Words alongside Jason Bateman, the ensemble comedy-drama This Is Where I Leave You, and Peter Bogdanovich's She's Funny That Way alongside Owen Wilson.

In 2014 Hahn was cast as Rabbi Raquel Fein in the Amazon Studios critically acclaimed dark comedy-drama Transparent, whose creator, Joey Soloway, had directed her in Afternoon Delight. She received an Emmy nomination for Outstanding Supporting Actress in a Comedy Series (2017) as well as a Screen Actors Guild Award nomination along with the cast. In 2015 she starred alongside Steve Coogan in the Showtime comedy-drama Happyish, but the show was canceled after a single season. That year Hahn co-starred alongside George Clooney and Hugh Laurie in the science-fiction adventure film Tomorrowland, and starred in the box-office horror hit The Visit.

In 2016 Hahn appeared alongside Viggo Mortensen in the drama film Captain Fantastic, and starred alongside Mila Kunis, Christina Applegate, Kristen Bell and Jada Pinkett Smith in the comedy film Bad Moms. IndieWire's Kate Erbland gave the film a B−, noting that it "boasts some good jokes but Hahn's revelatory performance is the big draw." The film went on to earn more than $183.9 million with a budget of $20 million. She next appeared in the Amazon comedy series I Love Dick, based on the novel by the same name by Chris Kraus and directed by Joey Soloway. It premiered on August 19, 2016.

Following the financial success from Bad Moms, STX Entertainment greenlit a sequel titled A Bad Moms Christmas. The sequel earned more than $130 million with a budget of $28 million.

2018–present: Focus on television 

In 2018, Hahn starred in the drama film Private Life, directed by Tamara Jenkins. She received critical acclaim for her performance. She also began appearing in television commercials for Chrysler.

The same year, Hahn had voice roles in two animated films from Sony Pictures Animation. First, Hahn provided the voice of character Ericka Van Helsing in the comedy Hotel Transylvania 3: Summer Vacation. Second, Hahn had a voice role in the film Spider-Man: Into the Spider-Verse, as a female version of Doctor Octopus, named Olivia Octavius.

In 2019, Hahn starred in and produced the HBO comedy miniseries Mrs. Fletcher. Hahn's performance as protagonist Eve Fletcher received critical praise.

In 2020, Hahn starred in the HBO drama miniseries I Know This Much Is True, based on the novel of the same name by Wally Lamb opposite Mark Ruffalo. That same year, Hahn began voicing Paige Hunter in the Apple TV+ animated musical comedy series Central Park. Apple Inc. had given a two-season order to Central Park, with each season set to consist of thirteen episodes.

In 2021, Hahn joined the Marvel Cinematic Universe by starring in the Disney+ limited series WandaVision as Agnes, a mysterious "nosy neighbor", later revealed to be Agatha Harkness. Her next miniseries The Shrink Next Door premiered on Apple TV+ on November 12, 2021. She played Jo Polniaczek in The Facts of Life segment of the third edition of Live in Front of a Studio Audience on December 7, 2021. She is set to star in the sequel to the 2019 mystery film Knives Out and the WandaVision spinoff focused on Harkness, Agatha: House of Harkness. When the series was first reported a month earlier, it was also stated Hahn signed an overall deal with Marvel Studios. In July 2022, the project was retitled Agatha: Coven of Chaos. In June 2022, it was announced that she would star in the upcoming Hulu limited series Tiny Beautiful Things based on the bestselling novel. During the Summer of 2022, Hahn was featured in a series of "Back to School" commercials for Amazon.

Personal life
Hahn is married to actor Ethan Sandler, whom she met at Northwestern University. The couple resides in Los Angeles and have two children: Leonard and Mae.

Filmography

Film

Television

Theater

Discography

Awards and nominations

References

External links

 
 

1973 births
Living people
20th-century American actresses
21st-century American actresses
Actresses from Illinois
Actresses from Ohio
American film actresses
American stage actresses
American television actresses
American voice actresses
Comedians from Illinois
Comedians from Ohio
Northwestern University School of Communication alumni
People from Cleveland Heights, Ohio
People from Westchester, Illinois
Yale School of Drama alumni